is a Japanese male singer-songwriter from Atsugi, Kanagawa. He is signed onto Sony Music Japan. He is also a leader of rock band Tube.  He released the hits "Sobani Iruyo" and "Try Boy, Try Girl".

References 

1965 births
Living people
Japanese male singer-songwriters
Japanese singer-songwriters
Tube (band) members
Sony Music Entertainment Japan artists
Japanese racehorse owners and breeders
Musicians from Kanagawa Prefecture
Being Inc. artists